Saint Relindis (or Renule) (died 750), sister of Saint Herlindis, was the daughter of count Adelard who built a Benedictine monastery at Maaseik for his daughters. Herlindis was abbess of the abbey until her death, after which Relindis was named to succeed her by Saint Boniface.

Relindus was gifted in embroidery and painting. The vestments of Sts. Harlindis and Relindis, now in Maaseik, Belgium are the earliest surviving examples of Anglo-Saxon embroidery. Traditionally attributed as the work of Sts. Harlindis and Relindis themselves, the works are not that old and are of Anglo-Saxon English origin, dated to the second half of the ninth century.

Her feast day is 6 February.

References

External links
Relindis at Catholic Online
6 February saints at St. Patrick's Church

Year of birth missing
750 deaths
Belgian Roman Catholic saints
8th-century Christian saints
Frankish abbesses
Medieval Belgian saints
Female saints of medieval Belgium
8th-century Frankish nuns